Replica is an online magazine published by Global Tat Productions. The magazine claims to be the pioneer of collective journalism, a form of reported media whereby all material within the publication is contributed by the public.

History and profile
Replica was founded in early 2008 by Thomas Foxley and Rosie Allen-Jones and is considered a British cult.

See also
Collaborative writing

References

External links
Official Website

Bi-monthly magazines published in the United Kingdom
Online magazines published in the United Kingdom
Downloadable magazines
English-language magazines
Independent magazines
Magazines about the media
Magazines established in 2008